Drenje is a small hamlet in Istria County, Croatia. It is situated just off the coast of the Gulf of Quarnero in the Adriatic Sea. It is part of the Labinština peninsula in Istria.

References

Populated places in Istria County